There are several historic buildings known as the Burns Philip Building for their association with company Burns Philp:

 Burns Philp Building, Sydney
 Burns Philp Building, Normanton
 Burns Philp Building, Townsville